Frederickson is a surname. Notable people with the surname include:

David Frederickson (born 1944), American politician
Dennis Frederickson (born 1939), American politician
Dennis C. Frederickson (1931-2017), American politician
Gray Frederickson (1937–2022), American film producer
H. George Frederickson (1934–2020), American academic
Mark Frederickson (born 1960), American soccer player
Tucker Frederickson (born 1943), American football player

See also
Frederickson, Washington, census-designated place in Pierce County, Washington, United States
Frederickson Fieldhouse, former sports venue in Oklahoma City, Oklahoma